Hranice is a municipality and village in České Budějovice District in the South Bohemian Region of the Czech Republic. It has about 200 inhabitants.

Administrative parts
The village of Trpnouze is an administrative part of Hranice.

References

Villages in České Budějovice District